Aythami Ruano (born 18 June 1977) is a Spanish judoka.

Achievements

External links
 

1977 births
Living people
Judoka at the 2004 Summer Olympics
Spanish male judoka
Olympic judoka of Spain
21st-century Spanish people